The Dream is the eighth studio album by the English electronic music group The Orb. It was released on 27 August 2007 by Liquid Sound Design, Traffic Inc., and Six Degrees Records. The album represents something of a return to their earlier sound and shares much more in common with their 2004 album Bicycles and Tricycles as opposed to the minimal 2005 release Okie Dokie It's the Orb on Kompakt. Orb member Thomas Fehlmann was absent on the album, and Paterson was instead reunited with Martin Glover, and joined by Tim Bran of Dreadzone.

Track listing

References

External links

The Orb albums
2007 albums